Karampur , is a town and union council in Tehsil Mailsi, District Vehari, Punjab, Pakistan. Its geographical coordinates are 29° 54' 0" North, 72° 21' 0" East and its original name (with diacritics) is Karampur. It is one of the oldest towns in Vehari. The name "Karampur" is historically adopted after Karam Khan Waseer Grandfather of husain Khan Waseer, who was prominent among the early inhabitants of this settlement. The important tribes and families of the town are Kharal,Rajpoot, Arain  (mostly migrated from Haryana, India, after independence in 1947)
Peerzada,Shah, Borana and Waseer are already here. It has a fertile land so main occupation of the people is agriculture but now people are gradually shifting from agriculture to business, trade and services sectors.
There is an oldest man name Haji Dawood Khan Rajpoot(Late) was a leader of the town. But after his death earlier in 20's now everything has been changed there.

References

Populated places in Vehari District